"Wait on Me" is a 2014 song by British band Rixton.

Wait on Me may also refer to:
"Wait on Me", song by Lil Twist with Khalil (singer)
"Wait on Me", song by Raheem DeVaughn from Guru's Jazzmatazz, Vol. 4: The Hip Hop Jazz Messenger: Back to the Future

See also
Wait for Me (disambiguation)